Edward Wong (born November 14, 1972) is an American journalist. He is a diplomatic correspondent for The New York Times.

Early life and education 
Wong was born November 14, 1972 in Washington, D.C. He grew up in Alexandria, Virginia. 

Wong received a bachelor of arts summa cum laude with a major in English literature from the University of Virginia in 1994. He received a masters in journalism and a master in international and area studies (joint master’s degrees) from the University of California, Berkeley in 1999. 

Wong studied Mandarin Chinese at Beijing Language and Culture University, Taiwan University, and Middlebury College.

Career 
In October 1999, Wong joined the New York Times. For four years he worked on the Metro, Sports, Business and Foreign desks. From November 2003 to 2007 he covered the Iraq War. From 2008 to 2016, he reported from China. He was the New York Times' Beijing bureau chief. Wong has taught international reporting as a visiting professor at Princeton University and the University of California, Berkeley. He has been a Nieman Fellow at Harvard University.

In 2006, while a reporter for the New York Times, Wong received a Livingston Award in the Excellence in International Reporting category for his coverage of the Iraq War. He was a member of the New York Times team that was a finalist for the Pulitzer Prize for International Reporting.

Notes

American journalists of Chinese descent
American newspaper editors
American writers of Chinese descent
Journalists from Washington, D.C.
Living people
UC Berkeley Graduate School of Journalism alumni
University of Virginia alumni
The New York Times writers
American war correspondents
1972 births
Livingston Award winners for International Reporting